The Sixth Government of the Lao People's Democratic Republic was established on 8 June 2006.

Ministries

Committees and others

References

Specific

Bibliography
Books:
 
 
 

Governments of Laos
2006 establishments in Laos
2011 disestablishments in Laos